Kalinke is an unincorporated community located in the town of Easton, Marathon County, Wisconsin, United States. The community is named for Gottlieb Kalinke, the farmer who had owned the land surrounding the community.

Notes

Unincorporated communities in Marathon County, Wisconsin
Unincorporated communities in Wisconsin